Geranium libani, the Lebanese geranium, is a species of flowering plant in the family Geraniaceae, native to wooded mountains in Lebanon, Syria and central Turkey.

Description
Geranium libani has a thick, branching rhizome; the ascending stems are hairy. This plant reaches on average  in height. The petiolate leaves have five lobes. The flowers have a diameter of 4 to 10 cm and are purple. The flowering period extends from March through June. The 3 cm fruit is a capsule with pubescent valves.

References

libani
Flora of Lebanon